The West American Digest System is a system of identifying points of law from reported cases and organizing them by topic and key number. The system was developed by West Publishing to organize the entire body of American law. This extensive taxonomy makes the process of doing case law legal research less time consuming as it directs the researcher to cases that are similar to the legal issue under consideration.

History

The problem of finding cases on a particular topic was a large problem for the rapidly growing American legal system of the 19th century. John B. West, the founder of West Publishing, described this problem in his article A multiplicity of reports.  To solve the problem, he developed a system with two major parts.  First, his company began to regularly publish cases from many American jurisdictions in bound volumes called reporters (the West National Reporter System now covers all state and federal appellate courts, as well as certain trial courts). Second, he put together a classification system in which he divided the law into major categories which he called topics (such as "Contracts").  He then created hundreds of subcategories.  To save space in printing, these were given a number called a key number.  He then applied this "topic and key number" system to the cases he published. The key number is identified in the books with a key number and a key symbol graphic.

How it works
Each case published in a West reporter is evaluated by an editor who identifies the points of law cited or explained in the case.  The editor places the summaries of the points of law covered in the case at the beginning of the case.  These summaries are usually a paragraph long, and are called headnotes.  Each headnote is then assigned a topic and key number.  The headnotes are arranged according to their topic and key number in multi-volume sets of books called Digests.  A digest serves as a subject index to the case law published in West reporters. Headnotes are merely editorial guides to the points of law discussed or used in the cases, and the headnotes themselves are not legal authority.

West publishes West's Analysis of American Law, which is a complete guide to the topic and key number system, and it is revised periodically.

Print digest
In print, a digest works like an encyclopedia, in that the topics are listed in alphabetical order and printed on the spines. The "Descriptive Word Index" provides guidance as to the proper topics and key numbers.

The digest system includes digests for the individual states (except for Delaware, Nevada and Utah).  The U.S. Supreme Court, Bankruptcy Courts, Federal Claims Court, and military courts each have an individual digest, as well as their decisions being included in the Federal Practice Digest with the notes of decisions from the federal District Courts and Courts of Appeals.  Digests are also published for West's National Reporter System. Specialty subject digests exist, such as the Education Law Digest, and the Social Security Digest.

For nationwide research, about once a month, West publishes a General Digest volume, which incorporates classified digest notes from all reporters of the West National Reporter System. These are then cumulated into a Decennial Digest. Decennial implies that this occurs every ten years, but in the past several decades, there have been Decennial Digest Parts I and II (the 11th Series now has Part III), so the cumulation is now more frequent. However, the various Decennial Digests are not cumulated. Thus, completing such a search over several decades requires consulting the Decennial Digests, and then updating that work with the most recent series of the General Digest.

Some of the state and topical digests are revised to include the first cases in the jurisdiction, while the spines of the books of some of the other digests indicate that they are from "1933 to date," for instance, indicating that one must consult a prior series for references to earlier cases. The state, federal, regional, and topical digests are updated by interim pamphlets, pocket parts, replacement volumes, or a new series.

The Digest on Westlaw
Researchers can also search the digest electronically using Westlaw:
 with the "Key Number Search Tool", which uses a word search to identify up to five key numbers,
 with the "Key Numbers and Digest" feature (browse by subject using an expandable tree – no search terms required),
 by a key number search using the "Terms and Connectors" method (with a known topic and key number – in the form of 134k261; topic 134 is Divorce and the key number is 261 for "Enforcement, In general"),
 by using the KeySearch feature (a menu of hierarchical links that automatically generates a search without the need to see the key numbers or the terms and connectors query), or 
 by finding a relevant case using keyword searching and then using the key number hyperlinks in the document to find related cases.

Most secondary sources published by Thomson West, such as Corpus Juris Secundum and American Jurisprudence, also have key number hyperlinks in their on-line Westlaw versions.

The "Key Numbers and Digest" feature and the hyperlinks create a "Custom Digest".

The Custom Digest allows:
 selection of the jurisdiction of interest (so that headnotes from cases in that jurisdiction will appear in the results);
 limiting the time frame of the search; and 
 adding additional search terms.

Selecting key numbers and jurisdictions in the "Key Number Search Tool" results in a similar display of digest headnotes.
 
Since all West headnote annotations are merged on Westlaw into a single database from which each Custom Digest is generated, there is no need to consult each separate series of the hard copy Decennial Digest.  Full text of the cases may be accessed from the Custom Digest by clicking on the underlined case citation. The key number search or KeySearch will retrieve entire cases from a case law database.

Other digest systems 
Other digest systems exist, including Butterworth's Digest for the United Kingdom (also containing references to cases decided in other Commonwealth countries), the Canadian Abridgment, digests associated with official state reports, such as in California and Wisconsin, and digests associated with topical reporters, such as the Uniform Commercial Code Case Digest. Most of these use a topic and section format, while some, like the U.C.C. Case Digest, use a section format based on the statute or rules being annotated. The A.L.R. Digest, accompanying the American Law Reports, formerly had its own classification system, but was replaced in 2004 by West's American Law Reports Digest, which follows West's topic and key number system.

See also
 Citator
 Legal research

External references 
 West Topic & Key Number System - Westlaw Quick Reference Guide(.pdf)
 West product search for Key Number Digest
 West's Analysis of American Law product description
 West's A.L.R. Digest product description

References

West (publisher)
Legal research
 
Taxonomy